1960 South Korean presidential election may refer to:

 March 1960 South Korean presidential election
 August 1960 South Korean presidential election